John Makinson  (born 10 October 1954) is the Chairman of Kano, a London-based computing company which makes DIY computer and coding kits. He formerly served as chairman of the international publishing company Penguin Random House. He was chairman of The National Theatre from 2010 to 2016.

Biography
After being educated at Repton School and completing his degree at Cambridge University, John started working as a journalist, first at Reuters and then at the Financial Times, where he edited the influential "Lex" column. From there he moved to Saatchi and Saatchi's US holding company, before co-founding Makinson Cowell, a specialist independent financial consultancy firm. After five years, he returned to the Financial Times to become its managing director, before accepting a job as the Pearson Group finance director, where he worked until moving to the Penguin Group, a subsidiary of the Pearson Group. He was Chairman and CEO of Penguin Group (worldwide) from 2002 to 2013.

He was a co-chair of the International Rescue Committee, a humanitarian organisation, for many years. He was also Chairman of the National Theatre from 2010 to 2016.

He is married to actor and activist Nandana Sen, daughter of Nobel Laureate Amartya Sen and Padmashri-awardee Nabaneeta Dev Sen.

He has used his knowledge of business to help compile a report for the British government, called Incentives for Change, and received a CBE in 2001 for his services to public sector productivity. He was also photographed by Harry Borden for the National Portrait Gallery in Britain.

References

1954 births
Living people
English publishers (people)
English chief executives
Commanders of the Order of the British Empire
Directors of George Weston Limited
Financial Times people
Alumni of Christ's College, Cambridge